XII Turkmenistan President Cup (2006)

All matches played at Köpetdag Stadium, Ashgabat.

Group A

Group B

Third Place

Final 

 

2006
President's Cup
2006 in Uzbekistani football
2006 in Tajikistani football
2005–06 in Iranian football
2005–06 in Moldovan football
2005–06 in Ukrainian football